Augustin Hadelich (born April 4, 1984) is an Italian-German-American Grammy-winning classical violinist.

Biography

Early life and education 

Augustin Hadelich was born in Cecina, Italy, to German parents. His two older brothers were already playing cello and piano when Hadelich (age 5) began his studies on the violin with his father, an agriculturalist and amateur cellist. In his early musical development, Hadelich progressed in his studies through irregular lessons and masterclasses from violinists traveling near the Hadelich farm in rural Tuscany, including Uto Ughi, Christoph Poppen, Igor Ozim, and Norbert Brainin. Hadelich enjoyed a blossoming career as a wunderkind violinist, pianist, and composer in Germany.

In 1999, Hadelich was injured in a fire on his family's farm in Italy, and was airlifted to be treated in Germany. The accident left Hadelich unable to play for over a year. "It is perhaps because of this experience—because I had this moment where I wasn't sure if I would ever play the violin again—that I appreciate what is happening in my life more. I really try to enjoy every moment. It made me realize how important music was to me," Hadelich has commented. After his recovery, Hadelich graduated summa cum laude from the Instituto Mascagni in Livorno, Italy, and successfully auditioned for admission to The Juilliard School.

From 2004 to 2007, Hadelich studied at Juilliard with Joel Smirnoff, graduating with a Graduate Diploma (2005) and an Artist Diploma (2007). After graduating, Hadelich continued to make his home in New York and became an American citizen in 2014.

Career 

Shortly after winning first prize at the International Violin Competition of Indianapolis in 2006, Augustin Hadelich proved himself ready for the world stage through several short-notice substitutions with major orchestras. In 2008 he filled in for Julian Rachlin at the Hollywood Bowl, performing with the Los Angeles Philharmonic. In 2010, Hadelich made his New York Philharmonic debut at the Bravo! Vail Festival substituting for violinist Nikolaj Znaider.

In the ensuing decade he has returned to the Los Angeles Philharmonic and the New York Philharmonic numerous times and performed with all other major orchestras in North America, such as the Boston Symphony, Cleveland Orchestra, Chicago Symphony, Philadelphia Orchestra, San Francisco Symphony, and the symphony orchestras of Atlanta, Baltimore, Cincinnati, Dallas, Detroit, Florida, Houston, Minnesota, Montréal, Oregon, Seattle, St. Louis, Toronto, Utah and Vancouver. Hadelich has also made his debuts with prestigious orchestras in Europe and Asia, among them the Bavarian Radio Symphony Orchestra, the Munich Philharmonic, the London Philharmonic Orchestra, the, Royal Liverpool Philharmonic Orchestra, the Royal Concertgebouw Orchestra, the NHK Symphony Orchestra (Tokyo), and the Hong Kong Philharmonic Orchestra.
In 2019 he was named Artist in Association with the NDR Elbphilharmonie Orchestra in Hamburg, a title he will hold for 3 years.

Hadelich is known to perform a wide range of repertoire. Although he is often scheduled to perform from the standard violin concerto repertoire (Beethoven, Brahms, Sibelius, Tchaikovsky, etc.), he is also a champion of contemporary works, such as the violin concertos by Thomas Adès, Henri Dutilleux and György Ligeti, and recital works by Brett Dean, David Lang, György Kurtag, Toru Takemitsu and Bernd Alois Zimmermann.

Awards and accolades 

Augustin Hadelich was named the 2018 "Instrumentalist of the Year" by Musical America.

In December 2017, Hadelich was awarded an honorary doctorate from the University of Exeter in the UK.

In February 2016, Hadelich won his first Grammy Award for the Best Classical Instrumental Solo category at the 58th Grammy Awards in Los Angeles for his performance of Henri Dutilleux’s Violin Concerto, ‘L'arbre des songes’, with the Seattle Symphony and music director Ludovic Morlot on the Seattle Symphony Media label.

In October 2015, Hadelich became the inaugural winner of the Warner Music Prize, which includes a grant of $100,000 and a recording opportunity with Warner Classics.

Hadelich won the gold medal at the 2006 International Violin Competition of Indianapolis, where he also received several additional accolades, including the best performance of a Romantic concerto, Classical concerto, Beethoven sonata, violin sonata other than Beethoven, Bach work, commissioned work, encore piece and Paganini caprice.

Hadelich has also received an Avery Fisher Career Grant (2009), a Borletti-Buitoni Trust Fellowship (2011) and Lincoln Center’s Martin E. Segal Award (2012).

Discography 

Augustin Hadelich records exclusively for the Warner Classics label, and his first recording for the label, of Paganini's 24 Caprices for solo violin, was released in January 2018.
In April 2019, Warner Classics released Hadelich's recording of the concertos by Brahms and Ligeti with the Norwegian Radio Orchestra conducted by Miguel Harth-Bedoya.

For his 2015 recording of Henri Dutilleux’s Violin Concerto ('L'arbre des songes') with the Seattle Symphony and Ludovic Morlot, on the Seattle Symphony's label, Hadelich was awarded the 2016 Grammy for Best Classical Instrumental Solo.

2017 saw the release of Hadelich's recording of live performances of the Tchaikovsky concerto and Lalo's Symphonie Espagnole were released on the London Philharmonic label.

Previously to signing with Warner Classics, Hadelich released six CDs for the AVIE label between 2009 and 2016. His 2014 album of the violin concertos of Sibelius and Thomas Adès with Hannu Lintu and the Royal Liverpool Philharmonic Orchestra was nominated for a Gramophone award, and his 2016 duo album with pianist Joyce Yang was nominated for a 2018 Grammy Award in the category for Best Chamber Music / Small Ensemble Performance.

Hadelich also released two albums for Naxos in 2008 and 2009.

Complete recordings
Naxos – Telemann, 12 Fantasias for solo violin, 2007
Naxos – Haydn, complete violin concertos with Cologne Chamber Orchestra, 2008
Avie – Flying Solo: works by Bartók / Paganini / Ysaÿe / Zimmerman, 2009
Avie – Echoes of Paris: works by Poulenc / Stravinsky / Debussy / Prokofiev – with Robert Kulek, piano, 2011
Avie – Histoire du Tango: works by Piazzolla / De Falla / Paganini / Sarasate – with Pablo Sáinz Villegas, guitar, 2013
Avie – Sibelius, Violin Concerto / Thomas Adès, Violin Concerto (Concentric Paths) with Royal Liverpool Philharmonic and Hannu Lintu, 2014
Avie – Bartók, Violin Concerto No. 2 / Mendelssohn, Violin Concerto – Norwegian Radio Orchestra, Miguel Harth-Bedoya (conductor), 2015
Seattle Symphony Media – Dutilleux, L'arbre des songes – Seattle Symphony, Ludovic Morlot (cond.), 2015
Avie – works by Franck / Kurtág / Previn / Schumann – with Joyce Yang, piano, 2016
London Philharmonic – Tchaikovsky, Violin Concerto / Lalo, Symphonie Espagnole – London Philharmonic Orchestra, Vasily Petrenko (cond.), Omer Meir Wellber (cond.), 2017
Cantaloupe Music – David Lang, "Mystery Sonatas", 2018
Warner Classics – Paganini, 24 Caprices for solo violin, 2018
Warner Classics – Brahms and Ligeti Violin Concertos – Norwegian Radio Orchestra, Miguel Harth-Bedoya (conductor), Recorded 2017/2018, released 2019
Warner Classics – Bohemian Tales – Violin Concerto (Dvořák), works by Antonín Dvorák, Leos Janácek, Josef Suk / Bavarian Radio Symphony Orchestra, Jakub Hrůša (conductor), 2020
Warner Classics – Bach Sonatas & Partitas, 2021

Instrument 

From October 2006 until August 2010, Hadelich performed with the 1683 "ex-Gingold" Stradivari as the standing first-prize winner of the Indianapolis Competition.

Hadelich then performed with the 1723 Kiesewetter Stradivarius violin, on loan from Clement and Karen Arrison through the Stradivari Society of Chicago.

Hadelich currently performs with the 1744 "Leduc / Szeryng" Guarneri del Gesu lent to him through the Tarisio Trust for an extended period.

References

External links
 
 Augustin Hadelich's YouTube channel
 Schmidt Artists – general management of Augustin Hadelich
 Homepage of the Indianapolis competition

Italian violinists
American violinists
German violinists
German male violinists
Living people
Burn survivors
1984 births
21st-century violinists
21st-century classical violinists
21st-century German male musicians
People from Cecina, Tuscany